Maisonneuve was a federal electoral district in Quebec, Canada, that was represented in the House of Commons of Canada from 1896 to 1935.

A "Maisonneuve" riding also existed from 1966 to 1970 when it renamed "Maisonneuve—Rosemont", and from 1976 to 1978 when it was renamed "Hochelaga—Maisonneuve". See those article for information on those periods.

This riding was created in 1892 from parts of Hochelaga ridings.

The electoral district of Maisonneuve consisted initially of:
 the towns of Maisonneuve and Côte St. Louis,
 the villages of Côte de la Visitation and Mile End, and
 Hochelaga and St. Jean Baptiste wards in the city of Montreal.

In 1914, it was redefined to consist of:
 the town of Maisonneuve,
 Rosemount ward and Longue Point ward of the city of Montreal,
 Pointe-aux-Trembles town and parish,
 Rivière-des-Prairies,
 Sault au Recollet town and parish,
 St. Léonard-de-Port-Maurice,
 the town of Montréal Est,
 the town of St. Michel-de-Laval, and
 the area on which is situated the St. Jean-de-Dieu hospital.

In 1924, it was redefined to consist of:
 the portion of the Island of Montreal lying north of a line drawn from Rivière des Prairies along Ste. Claire Avenue, the southern boundary of the Seminary of St. Sulpice's domain, Crémazie Boulevard, St. Hubert Street, Côte St. Michel Road, the northwestern limit of the city of Montreal, Iberville Street, the Canadian Pacific Railway track, Nolan Street, and Bourbonnière Avenue, to the St. Lawrence River.

It was abolished in 1933 when it was redistributed into Maisonneuve—Rosemont and Mercier ridings.

Members of Parliament

This riding elected the following Members of Parliament:

Election results

By-election: On Mr. Préfontaine being appointed Minister of Marine and Fisheries, 11 November 1902

By-election: On Mr. Préfontaine's death, 25 December 1905

By-election: On Mr. Robitaille's death, 16 January 1932

See also 

 List of Canadian federal electoral districts
 Past Canadian electoral districts

External links
Riding history from the Library of Parliament

Former federal electoral districts of Quebec